José María Basterra Ochoa (born 3 January 1997) is a Spanish field hockey player who plays as a forward for Club de Campo and the Spanish national team. During the summer of 2020, he has participated in the Tokyo Olympic Games.

Club career
Basterra started playing hockey at age six at Jolaseta in Getxo. He made his debut for the first senior team in 2012 when he was just fifteen years old. From 2015 to 2017 he played for Complutense in Madrid. In 2017 after the 2017 Men's EuroHockey Junior Championship, he signed for the other Madrid club Club de Campo. He was named the best player of the División de Honor in the 2020–21 season as Club de Campo won their first ever Spanish national title.

International career
Basterra made his debut for the senior national team in February 2021 in a FIH Pro League match against Belgium. On 25 May 2021, he was selected in the squad for the 2021 EuroHockey Championship, his first senior tournament. He competed in the 2020 Summer Olympics.

References

External links

1997 births
Living people
Male field hockey forwards
Field hockey players at the 2020 Summer Olympics
Spanish male field hockey players
Olympic field hockey players of Spain
Place of birth missing (living people)
Club de Campo Villa de Madrid players
División de Honor de Hockey Hierba players